Basiran (also Romanized as Başīrān; also known as Başīrūn and Mazra‘eh-ye Başīrān) is a village in Khonjesht Rural District, in the Central District of Eqlid County, Fars Province, Iran. At the 2006 census, its population was 24, in 5 families.

References 

Populated places in Eqlid County